Dizjan or Dizejan may refer to:
 Dizjan, Golpayegan, Isfahan Province
 Dizjan, Semirom, Isfahan Province
 Dizjan, Qom